The Australian Men's Curling Championship is the national curling championship of men's curling in Australia. The winners of the tournament represent Australia at the Pacific-Asia Curling Championships. The event is organized by the Australian Curling Federation.

The event is normally held in Naseby, New Zealand, as Australia currently lacks a dedicated curling facility.

Champions and medallists 
The past champions and medallists of the event are listed as follows:

(skips marked bold)

References

See also

 Australian Women's Curling Championship
 Australian Mixed Curling Championship
 Australian Mixed Doubles Curling Championship
 Australian Junior Curling Championships
 Australian Senior Curling Championships
 Australian Wheelchair Curling Championship

 
Recurring sporting events established in 1991
1991 establishments in Australia
Curling competitions in Australia